The Hundred of Cudlamudla is a cadastral hundred of the County of Newcastle in South Australia, that is located at .
The traditional owners of the area are the Ngadjuri people. The first European explorer to the area was Thomas Burr in September 1842.
 
The nearby town of Willochra was surveyed in 1860 but the town never properly developed and was abandoned during the drought in the 1860s.

References

Cudlamudla
1874 establishments in Australia